Croatian singer Franka Batelić has released one studio album and 26 singles.

Batelić's debut studio album S tobom was released in December 2018 and peaked at number nineteen on the Top of the Shops chart in Croatia. The album's lead single "S tobom" peaked at number three on the Croatian HR Top 40 chart and spawned five additional top 10 singles. She released three stand-alone number one singles, "Sve dok sanjaš", "Samo s tobom meni Božić je" and "Bolji ljudi".

Albums

Studio albums

Singles

As lead artist

As featured artist

Videography

Music videos

References

Discographies of Croatian artists
Pop music discographies